Nigrospora is a genus of fungi belonging to the family Trichosphaeriaceae.

The genus has cosmopolitan distribution. Fossils have been found in 12 million year old rocks from central England.

Species

Nigrospora aerophila Bat. & Siqueira (1960)
Nigrospora arundinacea (Cooke & Massee) Potl. (1952)
Nigrospora aurantiaca Mei Wang & L. Cai (2017)
Nigrospora bambusae Mei Wang & L. Cai (2017)
Nigrospora brasiliensis A.C.Q. Brito, C. Conforto & A.R. Machado (2019)
Nigrospora camelliae-sinensis Mei Wang & L. Cai (2017)
Nigrospora canescens McLennan & Hoëtte (1933)
Nigrospora chinensis Mei Wang & L. Cai (2017)
Nigrospora falsivesicularis M. Raza & L. Cai (2019)
Nigrospora gorlenkoana Novobr. (1972)
Nigrospora guilinensis Mei Wang & L. Cai (2017)
Nigrospora hainanensis Mei Wang & L. Cai (2017)
Nigrospora javanica Palm (1918)
Nigrospora lacticolonia Mei Wang & L. Cai (2017)
Nigrospora macarangae Tennakoon, C.H. Kuo & K.D. Hyde (2021)
Nigrospora magnoliae N.I. de Silva, Lumyong & K.D. Hyde (2021)
Nigrospora maydis (Garov.) Hol.-Jech. (1963)
Nigrospora musae McLennan & Hoëtte (1933)
Nigrospora oryzae (Berk. & Broome) Petch (1924)
Nigrospora osmanthi Mei Wang & L. Cai (2017)
Nigrospora padwickii Prasad, Agnihotri & J.P. Agarwal (1960)
Nigrospora panici Zimm. (1902)
Nigrospora pyriformis Mei Wang & L. Cai (2017)
Nigrospora rubi Mei Wang & L. Cai (2017)
Nigrospora sacchari (Speg.) E.W. Mason (1927)
Nigrospora saccharicola M. Raza & L. Cai (2019)
Nigrospora sacchari-officinarum M. Raza & L. Cai (2019)
Nigrospora singularis M. Raza & L. Cai (2019)
Nigrospora vesicularifera M. Raza & L. Cai (2019)
Nigrospora vesicularis Mei Wang & L. Cai (2017)
Nigrospora zimmermanii Crous (2017)

References

Trichosphaeriales
Sordariomycetes genera